Pomerene is a populated place in Cochise County, Arizona, United States. Roll has the ZIP Code of 85627; in 2000, the population of the 85627 ZCTA was 140.

Transportation
Benson Area Transit provides transportation to Benson one day a week.

References

Populated places in Cochise County, Arizona
Populated places in the San Pedro Valley (Arizona)